The Senior Citizens Party was a political party in the United Kingdom from 2004–2014, which focused on the rights of people over the age of 50, senior citizens. They claimed a membership of several thousand.

The party was founded in January 2004 by Grahame Leon-Smith, formerly the party leader, and Terry Pattinson. They claim that they had previously been lifelong Conservative and Labour Party voters respectively, Leon-Smith serving as a councillor for 6 years, but had become disillusioned by the breaking of the link between pensions and average earnings by the Conservatives and Labour's failure to restore it. They also campaigned against council tax, proposing a local income tax, and campaign for free personal care for the elderly, free off-peak travel, and free television licences.

The party won 42,861 votes in the South East in the European Parliament election, 2004 and stood candidates against Tony Blair and Michael Howard in the 2005 UK general election. Leon-Smith received 151 votes (0.3%) in Folkestone and Hythe, and Pattinson received 97 votes (0.2%) in Sedgefield. In the run up to the 2005 General Election the Senior Citizens Party had meetings discussing an electoral alliance with the English Democrats. In May 2006, Leon-Smith and Pattinson stood for the party in the Runnymede Borough Council election, receiving 261 votes between them.

According to their Electoral Commission registration, the leader, nominating officer and treasurer was Leon-Smith, whilst Pattinston is Campaigns Officer. Their accounts filed for the years 2004 and 2007 indicate that they had "approximately 4,000 members and associate members". The annual membership fee was £12, but associate members do not pay anything. The ratio of full to associate members was not specified.
The Senior Citizens Party merged with UKIP in March 2014, as announced by Leon-Smith at the UKIP conference.

See also
 Scottish Senior Citizens Unity Party

References

External links
 Grey panthers. Interview with Leon-Smith on BBC Breakfast in July 2004 (Real Audio Media).
 Archived website in December 2004

Political parties established in 2004
Defunct political parties in the United Kingdom
Pensioners' parties
Old age in the United Kingdom
2004 establishments in the United Kingdom
Political parties disestablished in 2014
2014 disestablishments in the United Kingdom